Lonnie Dennis (born December 10, 1937- January 6, 1997) is a former professional Canadian football player with the Canadian Football League's the British Columbia Lions. After playing college football at Brigham Young University, Dennis spent his entire 9-year CFL career as an offensive lineman for the Lions. He was named CFL All-Star in 1963 and 1964, and was a part of the Lions Grey Cup victory in 1964.

References 

1937 births
Living people
American players of Canadian football
BC Lions players
BYU Cougars football players
Canadian football offensive linemen
Players of American football from Los Angeles
Players of Canadian football from Los Angeles